RFA Black Rover was a Rover-class small fleet tanker of the British Royal Fleet Auxiliary. She was designed to replenish ships underway at sea with fuel, fresh water, and stores in all weather conditions. She had a helicopter deck served by a stores lift and was capable of conducting helicopter replenishment. Displacing 16,160 tonnes, she was powered by twin diesels and has a ship's company of 60.

History

Black Rover was launched by Swan Hunter on 30 August 1973 and was accepted into service the following year. She was in refit in Rosyth during the Falklands Conflict and took no part in the efforts to liberate the islands.

Black Rover was deployed from UK in June 2005 and its tasking included assisting with post-tsunami reconstruction and participation in multi-national exercises in the Far East as the UK's component of the Five Power Defence Arrangement.

In 2006 she was the Flag Officer Sea Training (FOST) tanker, and in September she hosted the RFA recruitment video film crew. Her role as FOST tanker allowed the film makers to capture many of the RFA's capabilities. The busy nature of the FOST schedule allowed the film crew to experience a wide variety of exercises and evolutions during their time on board.

In 2013, Black Rover deployed to the Falkland Islands and South Georgia.

Black Rover was scheduled to decommission in 2016  however she never returned to sea under her own power after docking in Birkenhead in September 2015.

Disposal
In March 2017, after 18 months alongside in Birkenhead, Black Rover was towed to Portsmouth. On 29 August 2017 the Defence Equipment Sales Authority (DESA)  invited expressions of interest from companies interested in receiving an invitation to tender in respect to the proposed sale for the sole purpose of recycling of the former RFA ship. She departed Portsmouth under tow on 11 August and arrived at Aliaga on 1 September 2019. Scrapping was completed on 20 January 2020.

References

Ships of the Royal Fleet Auxiliary
Tankers of the Royal Fleet Auxiliary
Rover-class tankers
1973 ships
Ships built by Swan Hunter
Ships built on the River Tyne